Wheeler may refer to:

Places

United States
 Wheeler, Alabama, an unincorporated community
 Wheeler, Arkansas, an unincorporated community
 Wheeler, California, an unincorporated community
 Wheeler, Illinois, a village
 Wheeler, Indiana, a census-designated place
 Wheeler, Mississippi, an unincorporated community
 Wheeler, Nebraska, a ghost town
 Wheeler, New York, a town
 Wheeler, Oregon (disambiguation)
 Wheeler, Texas, a city
 Wheeler, Virginia, an unincorporated community
 Wheeler, Washington, a census-designated place
 Wheeler, West Virginia, an unincorporated community
 Wheeler, Wisconsin, a village
 Wheeler County (disambiguation)
 Wheeler Crest or Ridge, a ridge in Mono and Inyo Counties, California
 Wheeler Dam, Alabama
 Wheeler Lake, the lake created by the dam
 Wheeler Geologic Area, a protected area of Mineral County, Colorado
 Wheeler Island, Connecticut
 Wheeler Islands (West Virginia)
 Wheeler National Wildlife Refuge, near Decatur, Alabama
 Wheeler Peak (disambiguation)
 Wheeler Township (disambiguation)

Elsewhere
 Cape Wheeler, Palmer Land, Antarctica
 Wheeler Valley, Victoria Land, Antarctica
 Wheeler Island (Queensland), Australia
 Wheelers Bay, on the south-east coast of the Isle of Wight, England
 Wheeler Street, Cambridge, England
 Wheeler Glacier, a glacier in South Georgia and the South Sandwich Islands, British overseas territory
 Abdul Kalam Island, India, formerly Wheeler Island
 31555 Wheeler, an asteroid

People
 Wheeler (surname)
 Wheeler (given name)

Military uses
 Wheeler Army Airfield, Honolulu, Hawaii, U.S.
 Camp Wheeler, a former U.S. Army base near Macon, Georgia
 Operation Wheeler/Wallowa, an American offensive during the Vietnam War
 A nuclear device detonated in 1957 in Nevada, U.S., as part of Operation Plumbbob

Schools
 Wheeler School, Providence, Rhode Island, U.S.
 Wheeler High School (disambiguation), at least five schools in the U.S.

Transportation
 Wheeler Road, a road in Georgia, United States
 Wheeler Airport, a private airport in Starke County, Indiana, United States
 Wheeler (METRORail station), a train station in Houston, Texas, United States

Other uses
 Wheeler Bank, Manitou Springs, Colorado, United States
 Wheeler Block (disambiguation)
 Wheeler Centre, a literary and publishing centre in Melbourne, Australia
 Wheeler Opera House, Aspen, Colorado, United States
 Wheeler Hall, on the campus of the University of California, Berkeley
 Wheeler baronets, a title in the Baronetage of the United Kingdom
 Wheelers (novel), a 2000 novel by Ian Stewart and Jack Cohen
 Wheelers, the men with wheels in Ozma of Oz by L. Frank Baum
 Dublin Wheelers, a cycling club based in Dublin, Ireland
 An alternative term for a wheelwright, used especially in the British Army
 Wheeler Field (Virginia Beach), a planned baseball park due to open in 2016 at Virginia Beach, Virginia, United States
 A. H. Wheeler, an Indian bookstore chain

See also
 Wheeler House (disambiguation)
 Wheeler-Kenyon method, a method of archaeological excavation